Route 264 or Highway 264 may refer to:

Canada
Manitoba Provincial Road 264
Prince Edward Island Route 264
Saskatchewan Highway 264

Israel
Route 264 (Israel)

Japan
 Japan National Route 264

United States
 Interstate 264 (multiple highways)
 U.S. Route 264
 Arizona State Route 264
 Arkansas Highway 264
 Georgia State Route 264
 Indiana State Road 264
 K-264 (Kansas highway)
 Maryland Route 264
 Minnesota State Highway 264
 Montana Secondary Highway 264
 Nevada State Route 264
 New Mexico State Road 264
 New York State Route 264
 Ohio State Route 264
 Pennsylvania Route 264 (former)
 South Dakota Highway 264 (former)
 Tennessee State Route 264
 Texas State Highway 264 (former)
 Texas State Highway Spur 264
 Farm to Market Road 264 (Texas)
 Utah State Route 264
 Virginia State Route 264